Anaïs Chevalier-Bouchet (born 12 February 1993) is a French biathlete. She competed at the 2014 Winter Olympics in Sochi, in the women's sprint and women's pursuit, as well as in the 2018 Winter Olympics. Her sister Chloé Chevalier is also a biathlete.

Career

Olympic Games
3 medals (2 silver, 1 bronze)

World Championships
7 medals (3 silver, 4 bronze)

*During Olympic seasons competitions are only held for those events not included in the Olympic program.
**The single mixed relay was added as an event in 2019.

World Cup
World Cup rankings

Individual victory
1 victory 

Relay victories
12 victories

Personal life
On 9 September 2017, Chevalier married with the former biathlete Martin Bouchet. On 29 October 2019 they had a baby called Emie.

References

External links

1993 births
Living people
Biathletes at the 2014 Winter Olympics
Biathletes at the 2018 Winter Olympics
Biathletes at the 2022 Winter Olympics
French female biathletes
Olympic biathletes of France
Biathlon World Championships medalists
Olympic silver medalists for France
Olympic bronze medalists for France
Olympic medalists in biathlon
Medalists at the 2018 Winter Olympics
Medalists at the 2022 Winter Olympics
People from Saint-Martin-d'Hères
Sportspeople from Isère
21st-century French women